Hydrobacteria is a taxon containing approximately one-third of prokaryote species, mostly gram-negative bacteria and their relatives. It was found to be the closest relative of an even larger group of Bacteria, Terrabacteria, which are mostly gram positive bacteria. The name Hydrobacteria (hydro = "water") refers to the moist environment inferred for the common ancestor of those species. In contrast, species of Terrabacteria possess adaptations for life on land.

The content of Hydrobacteria has grown to include these superphyla and phyla: Acidobacteriota, Aquificota, Bdellovibrionota, Campylobacterota, Deferribacterota, Dependentiae, Desulfobacterota, Desulfuromonadota, Elusimicrobiota, FCB superphylum, Myxococcota, Nitrospirota, Proteobacteria, PVC superphylum, and Spirochaetota. 

Some unrooted molecular phylogenetic analyses have not supported this dichotomy of Terrabacteria and Hydrobacteria, but the most recent genomic analyses, including those that have focused on rooting the tree, have found these two groups to be monophyletic. 

Hydrobacteria and Terrabacteria were inferred to have diverged approximately 3 billion years ago, suggesting that land (continents) had been colonized by prokaryotes at that time. Together, Hydrobacteria and Terrabacteria form a large group containing 97% of prokaryotes and 99% of all species of Bacteria known by 2009, and placed in the taxon Selabacteria, in allusion to their phototrophic abilities (selas = light). Currently, the bacterial phyla that are outside of Hydrobacteria + Terrabacteria, and thus justifying the taxon Selabacteria, are debated and may or may not include Fusobacteria.

"Gracilicutes," which was described in 1978 by Gibbons and Murray, is sometimes used in place of Hydrobacteria. However, "Gracilicutes" included cyanobacteria (a member of Terrabacteria) and was not constructed under the now generally accepted three-domain system. More recently, a redefinition of "Gracilicutes" was proposed but it did not include a molecular phylogeny or statistical analyses. Also, it did not follow the three-domain system, claiming instead that the lineage of eukaryotes + Archaea is nested within Bacteria as a close relative of Actinomycetota, a tree not supported in any molecular phylogeny..

Phylogeny  

The definition of two major divisions within the domain Bacteria, Hydrobacteria and Terrabacteria, has come largely from rooted phylogenetic analyses of genomes. Unrooted analyses have not fully supported this division, drawing attention to the importance of rooted trees of life. 

The two recent analyses of bacterial phylogeny both supported the division of Hydrobacteria and Terrabacteria. However, they interpreted the evolution of the cell wall differently, with one concluding that the last common ancestor of Bacteria was a monoderm (gram-positive bacteria) and the other concluding that it was a diderm (gram-negative bacteria). The following tree is redrawn from one of those two recent studies, showing the phylogeny of bacterial phyla and superphyla, with the position of Fusobacteria being unresolved and DST being the closest relative of Terrabacteria:

References 

Bacteria
Bacteriology
Infrakingdoms